pvServer is a 3GPP/2 standards compliant multimedia server that provides streaming and broadcast services to mobile devices.  pvServer is developed by PacketVideo Network Solutions , a wholly owned company of Alcatel-Lucent.  pvServer delivers multiple streams of live and pre-recorded audio / video content (MPEG-4, H.263 and H.264, Enhanced aacPlus, etc.) to devices with a 3GPP-compatible player. Besides RTSP, It also supports HTTP and RTMP streaming, all with rate-adaptive capability.

Overview
The pvServer consists of the following modules:

 The Streaming Module, which is a Unix-based "software appliance" for standards compliant multimedia streaming via RTSP/RTP connections to wireless clients.
 The Download Module, which is a Unix-based "software appliance" for standards compliant multimedia download via HTTP connection to wireless clients.  This is commonly known as HTTP Streaming.
 The Integration Services Module, which is a Java-based platform for multimedia service development and integration.

Major Customers
T-Mobile
Telus
Orange

External links
PacketVideo Network Solutions - PacketVideo Network Solutions's official site
Alcatel-Lucent - Alcatel-Lucent official site

Servers (computing)